Ferrera Erbognone is a comune (municipality) in the Province of Pavia in the Italian region Lombardy, located about 45 km southwest of Milan and about 25 km southwest of Pavia. It is included in the lower Lomellina historical region, on the banks of the Erbognone stream, an affluent of the Agogna.

Ferrera Erbognone borders the following municipalities: Galliavola, Lomello, Mezzana Bigli, Ottobiano, Pieve del Cairo, Sannazzaro de' Burgondi, Scaldasole, Valeggio.

References

Cities and towns in Lombardy